Terri Stander is the ward councillor for ward 5 in Nelson Mandela Bay. She is a former Member of Parliament (MP) for the Democratic Alliance (DA), South Africa's official opposition.

Background
Stander matriculated from Port Alfred High School in 2000. She then worked for Norufin Housing (Pty) Ltd (Housing Finance Provider) from 2001 to 2005. She holds a BA degree in Applied Psychology for Professional Contexts from the University of South Africa. Stander worked as a Human Resources Officer at the Central District Municipality in the North West between October 2005 to August 2006. In 2007, Stander started her own consultancy, HR Solutions. She wrote columns for AVUSA, discussing HR and IR matters. She is a former African National Congress member. She joined the party while she worked at CDM. She later left the party. In 2009, Stander participated in the Democratic Alliance's Young Leaders Programme. After finishing the programme, she became a party member and was elected as a branch chairperson in Port Alfred. Stander was elected as a proportional representative (PR) councillor for the DA in the Ndlambe Local Municipality in 2011.

Parliamentary career
In 2014, Stander was placed fourth on the DA's list of Eastern Cape candidates and 37th on the DA's national list for the National Assembly. She was elected to the National Assembly from the DA's national list. Parliamentary Leader Mmusi Maimane appointed Stander to the position of Shadow Deputy Minister of Environmental Affairs.

On 3 October 2015, DA Leader Mmusi Maimane appointed Stander as Shadow Deputy Minister of Public Enterprises. She was appointed Shadow Deputy Minister of Women on 24 November 2016. Her appointment took effect on 1 January 2017.

On 19 July 2018,  Stander opened a fraud and corruption case against Enoch Mgijima Local Municipality mayor Sisisi Tolashe, her predecessor Lindiwe Gunuza-Nkwentsha and other municipal officials. Stander said that she had singled them out because the municipality had failed to deliver services and that corruption had increased under their watch.

In 2019, Stander stood for re-election at 123rd on the DA's national list and 11th on the DA's Eastern Cape candidate list. She was not re-elected to parliament as the DA's electoral support decreased.

Post-parliamentary career
In September 2021, Stander was announced as the DA's ward councillor candidate for ward 5 in the Nelson Mandela Bay Metropolitan Municipality for the local government elections on 1 November 2021. She was elected at the election.

References

Living people
Year of birth missing (living people)
Place of birth missing (living people)
Afrikaner people
People from the Eastern Cape
Democratic Alliance (South Africa) politicians
Members of the National Assembly of South Africa
Women members of the National Assembly of South Africa